Blaze is the sixth album released by MGM Records in the US and Canada by the band Herman's Hermits (picture shows the rear of the record sleeve, as the front looks completely different, featuring no text).  The album was released in October 1967.  Blaze was not released in the UK at the time.  EMI/Columbia, the group's UK label, did press the LP, but for export sales only.

Track listing

Bonus Tracks (2001 Repertoire Release)
 "Sleepy Joe" (Russell Alquist, Carter)
 "Just One Girl" (John Paul Jones, Adrian Love)
 "London Look" (Gouldman)
 "Sunshine Girl" (Carter, Stephens)
 "Nobody Needs to Know" (Roger Brook, Hopwood, Leckenby)
 "Something's Happening" (Giancarlo Bigazzi, Riccardo Del Turco, Jack Fishman)
 "The Most Beautiful Thing in My Life" (K. Young)
 "Ooh, She's Done It Again" (Gouldman)
 "My Sentimental Friend" (Carter, Stephens)
 "My Lady" (David Most, Noone)
 "Here Comes the Star" (Johnny Young)
 "It's Alright Now" (Gouldman, Most, Noone)

New Zealand version
Side 1
 "Sleepy Joe" (Russell Alquist, John Carter)
 "Museum" (Donovan Leitch)
 "Upstairs, Downstairs" (Graham Gouldman)
 "Busy Line" (Karl Green, Keith Hopwood, Derek Leckenby)
 "Moonshine Man" (Green, Hopwood, Leckenby)
 "Green Street Green" (Geoff Stephens)

Side 2
 "I Can't Take or Leave Your Loving" (Rick Jones)
 "Don't Go Out Into the Rain (You're Going To Melt)" (Kenny Young)
 "I Call Out Her Name" (Green, Hopwood, Leckenby)
 "One Little Packet of Cigarettes" (Carter, Stephens)
 "Last Bus Home" (Peter Cowap)
 "Ace, King, Queen, Jack" (Cowap, Peter Noone)

1967 albums
Herman's Hermits albums
Albums produced by Mickie Most
MGM Records albums
EMI Columbia Records albums